SM U-16 was one of the 329 submarines serving in the Imperial German Navy in World War I.

Service history
U-16 was engaged in the naval warfare and took part in the First Battle of the Atlantic.

Summary of raiding history

References

Notes

Citations

Bibliography

World War I submarines of Germany
1911 ships
Ships built in Kiel
U-boats commissioned in 1911
U-boats sunk in 1919
Type U 16 submarines
U-boat accidents
Maritime incidents in 1919